Ard san Aer (High in the Sky) was an Irish language television programme which showed highlights of Gaelic games.

It was TG4's flagship Gaelic games show from November 1996 to October 2005. Originally a studio-based show which featured interviews with special guests discussing their favourite sporting moments, it later evolved into a weekly highlights programme showing the best of the weekends' Gaelic games action. Live games were also shown under the Ard san Aer Beo banner.

Ard san Aer underwent a revamp in 2005 and was renamed GAA 2005

References

1990s Irish television series
2000s Irish television series
Gaelic games on television
TG4 original programming